Alabama shooting may refer to:

 Geneva County shootings of March 2009, in which Michael Kenneth McLendon killed relatives and others in Geneva and Samson
 University of Alabama in Huntsville shooting in February 2010, in which Dr. Amy Bishop killed university colleagues